The 8th Parliament of Singapore was a meeting of the Parliament of Singapore. Its first session commenced on 6 January 1992 and was prorogued on 6 December 1993. It commenced its second session on 10 January 1994 and was dissolved on 16 December 1996.

The members of the 8th Parliament were elected in the 1991 general election. Parliament was controlled by a People's Action Party majority, led by Prime Minister Goh Chok Tong and his cabinet. The Speaker was Tan Soo Khoon. The de facto Leader of the Opposition was Chiam See Tong until he resigned as secretary-general of the Singapore Democratic Party on 17 May 1993, and was replaced by Ling How Doong, chairman of his party.

Officeholders 

 Speaker: Tan Soo Khoon (PAP)
 Deputy Speaker:
 Abdullah Tarmugi (PAP), until 30 June 1993
 Eugene Yap Giau Cheng (PAP), from 26 February 1993
 Prime Minister: Goh Chok Tong (PAP)
 Deputy Prime Minister:
 Lee Hsien Loong (PAP)
 Ong Teng Cheong (PAP), until 1 September 1993
 Tony Tan (PAP), from 1 August 1995
 Leader of the Opposition:
 Chiam See Tong (SDP), until 17 May 1993
 Ling How Doong (SDP), from 17 May 1993
 Leader of the House: Wong Kan Seng (PAP)
 Party Whip of the People's Action Party: Lee Boon Yang
 Deputy Party Whip of the People's Action Party:
 Ho Kah Leong
 Ong Chit Chung, from 30 April 1994

Composition

Members

Elected members 
This is the list of members of the 8th Parliament of Singapore elected in the 1991 general election.

Nominated Members of Parliament 

 Chia Shi Teck, from 7 September 1992 until 7 September 1994
 Robert Chua Teck Chew, from 7 September 1992 until 7 September 1994
 Kanwaljit Soin, from 7 September 1992
 Toh Keng Kiat, from 7 September 1992 until 7 September 1994
 Tong Kok Yeo, from 7 September 1992 until 7 September 1994
 Walter Woon, from 7 September 1992
 John De Payva, from 7 September 1994
 Imram bin Mohamed, from 7 September 1994
 Stephen Lee Ching Yen, from 7 September 1994
 Lee Tsao Yuan, from 7 September 1994

Changes in members

By-elections

Vacant seats

References 

Parliament of Singapore